The 1984 Giro d'Italia was the 67th running of the Giro. It started in Lucca, on 17 May, with a  prologue and concluded in Verona, on 10 June, with a  individual time trial. A total of 171 riders from nineteen teams entered the 22-stage race, that was won by Italian Francesco Moser of the Gis Gelati–Tuc Lu team. The second and third places were taken by Frenchman Laurent Fignon and Italian Moreno Argentin, respectively.

Amongst the other classifications that the race awarded, Urs Freuler of Atala–Campagnolo won the points classification, Fignon of Renault–Elf won the mountains classification, and Renault–Elf's Charly Mottet completed the Giro as the best neo-professional in the general classification, finishing twenty-first overall. Renault–Elf finishing as the winners of the team classification, ranking each of the twenty teams contesting the race by lowest cumulative time. The team points classification was won by Metauro Mobili–Pinarello.

Teams

A total of nineteen teams were invited to participate in the 1984 Giro d'Italia. Each team sent a squad of nine riders, which meant that the race started with a peloton of 171 cyclists. Riders represented a total of 18 countries. The presentation of the teams – where each team's roster and manager are introduced in front the media and local dignitaries – took place at the Piazza San Marco in Lucca on 16 May. Robin Morton, the team manager of the Gianna-Motta-Linea MD team, was the first female team manager ever in the Giro d'Italia. From the riders that began this edition, 143 made it to the finish in Merano.

The teams entering the race were:

Pre-race favorites

Team managers when asked about the favorite entering the race felt there was no clear favorite to win. La Gazzetta dello Sport felt four riders – Francesco Moser (Gis Gelati–Tuc Lu), Laurent Fignon, Giuseppe Saronni, and Roberto Visentini – had the best chances to win, but "there is no man who knows how to dominate." When asked about his biggest challenge, Moser stated: "First, Visentini, because last year he was second, he has a very homogeneous squad and is the Italian runner in better shape..." Ángel Ruocco of El País felt that the race would be between 1983 Tour de France champion Fignon and Saronni, the winner of the Giro the previous year. He added that Silvano Contini, Mario Beccia, and Fignon as other challengers. Marino Lejarreta who rode the 1984 Vuelta a España to prepare, as well as Alberto Fernández who displayed great results when the race reached the Apennines last year.

Route and stages

The route for the 1984 edition of the Giro d'Italia was revealed to the public by head organizer Vincenzo Torriani on 18 February 1984. Five of these eleven stages had summit finishes: stage 3, to Madonna di San Luca; stage 5, to Blockhaus; stage 16, to Bardonecchia; stage 19, to Selva di Val Gardena; and stage 20, to Arabba. The organizers chose to include two rest days. When compared to the previous year's race, the race was  shorter and contained the same number of time trials and rest days. In addition, this race contained the same number of stages.

Classification Leadership

Four different jerseys were worn during the 1984 Giro d'Italia. The leader of the general classification – calculated by adding the stage finish times of each rider, and allowing time bonuses for the first three finishers on mass-start stages – wore a pink jersey. This classification is the most important of the race, and its winner is considered as the winner of the Giro. Time bonuses of 20, 10, and 5 seconds were awarded to each stage's first three finishers.

For the points classification, which awarded a purple (or cyclamen) jersey to its leader, cyclists were given points for finishing a stage in the top 15; additional points could also be won in intermediate sprints. The green jersey was awarded to the mountains classification leader. In this ranking, points were won by reaching the summit of a climb ahead of other cyclists. Each climb was ranked as either first, second or third category, with more points available for higher category climbs. The Cima Coppi, the race's highest point of elevation, awarded more points than the other first category climbs. The Cima Coppi for this Giro was the originally the Stelvio Pass, but it was changed to the Pordoi Pass. The first rider to cross the Pordoi Pass was French rider Laurent Fignon. The white jersey was worn by the leader of young rider classification, a ranking decided the same way as the general classification, but considering only neo-professional cyclists (in their first three years of professional racing).

Although no jersey was awarded, there was also one classification for the teams, in which the stage finish times of the best three cyclists per team were added; the leading team was the one with the lowest total time. There was another team classification that awarded points to each team based on their riding's finishing position in every stage. The team with the highest total of points was the leader of the classification.

The rows in the following table correspond to the jerseys awarded after that stage was run.

Final standings

General classification

Points classification

Mountains classification

Young rider classification

Time trial classification

Trofeo Fiat Uno classification

Premio dell'Agonismo classification

Team classification

Team points classification

Aftermath

Since the race's conclusion, the race has been marred by accusations of race officials favoring Francesco Moser. On several occasions, Moser was seen drafting behind team cars and being pushed up mountains which is not allowed in the race rules. Moser was not penalized the times he committed the violations, but several other riders in the race were punished by officials when they committed the same infractions. Renault manager Cyrille Guimard especially upset with Moser's lack of punishment because his rider, Fignon, was awarded a twenty-second penalty for receiving food outside of the feed zone. Another instance appeared when the race officials cancelled the crossing of the Stelvio Pass during the eighteenth stage. Snow had fallen on the Stelvio and was thought to be able to be cleared by the day of the stage as race director Vincenzo Torriani had photos showing that it could be done. The French magazine Vélo published photos of the pass being clear of snow and open to the public. However, the day before the stage, the snow had yet to be cleared. There's speculation that a government official from Trent – Moser's hometown – would not allow the Giro to cross the Stelvio. The race was re-routed to go over the Tonale Pass and Palade Pass. The changes in the stage resulted in another collective finish of the general classification contenders, thus keeping the time gaps the same and playing into the hand of Moser. 1986 race winner Roberto Visentini quit the race because he felt the it was being fixed..
 In the final time trial, TV helicopters have been accused of flying low behind Moser in order to propel him forward, increasing his speed. Fignon told the media that the helicopters were flying in front of him in order to slow his pace.

Fignon later published an autobiography in 2010 entitled We Were Young and Carefree: The Autobiography of Laurent Fignon where he discussed this edition of the Giro. He wrote that the "breaches in the rules were obvious" and that Moser had received many pushes from spectators while climbing during the twentieth stage. Fignon elaborated on the final time trial, stating that the helicopter pilot "almost mowing the number off of my back with his rotorblades." He stated the helicopter's turbulence slowed him down and also nearly crashed him a few times during the stage. Ultimately, Fignon felt that if the entire race was run according to the route and abiding by the rules, he would've won the race. In 2015, Moser was inducted to the Giro d'Italia Hall of Fame. At the ceremony, he received a replica of the modern-day trophy for his victory in the race. Moser spoke of how he and Fignon talked years after the race and he still blamed his victory on the helicopter, while Moser insisted that the cheering from the crowds is what motivated him to perform so well during the day. He further commented on Fignon: "Poor Fignon! He lost two Grand Tours on the last day and in time trials, too. If either of those races had ended with a climb, it would have been a very different story."

References

Footnotes

Citations

Bibliography

 
Giro d'Italia by year
Giro d'Italia, 1984
Giro d'Italia, 1984
Giro d'Italia
Giro d'Italia
1984 Super Prestige Pernod International